Kathryn Grant may refer to:

 Kathryn Crosby, American actor who also used the stage name Kathryn Grant
 Kathryn Ptacek, American author who also wrote under her married name, Kathryn Grant
Katherine Grant, 12th Countess of Dysart (born 1918), Scottish peer
Cat Grant, fictional DC Comics character